Arramphus is a small genus of halfbeaks from the family Hemiramphidae from the coasts of Australia, the two species in the genus were formerly considered to be conspecific.

Species
The two species of Arrhamphus are:

 Arrhamphus krefftii (Steindachner, 1867) (Snubhose garfish)
 Arrhamphus sclerolepis Günther, 1866 (Northern snubnose garfish)

References

 
Hemiramphidae
Taxa named by Albert Günther